The Couser Barn is a dodecagon-shaped round barn in Cedar County, Nebraska.  It was built during 1912-13 for William Couser, a farmer who came to Nebraska from Shelby County, Iowa in 1899.  It was built in the second phase of centric barn construction in Nebraska, when light balloon framing allowed for large open spaces to be created.  An oral tradition holds that the design for the barn came from the University of Nebraska.

The barn has a hay hood.

See also
List of round barns

References

Barns on the National Register of Historic Places in Nebraska
Buildings and structures completed in 1912
Buildings and structures in Cedar County, Nebraska
Round barns in Nebraska
Barns with hay hoods